Sinophorus is a genus of parasitoid wasps belonging to the family Ichneumonidae.

The species of this genus are found in Europe and Northern America.

Species:
 Sinophorus albidus (Gmelin, 1790) 
 Sinophorus albipalpus Sanborne, 1984

References

Ichneumonidae
Ichneumonidae genera